Boris Ionovich Shklovskii (born 1944) is a theoretical physicist, at the William I Fine Theoretical Physics Institute, University of Minnesota, specializing in condensed matter. Shklovskii earned his A.B. degree in Physics, in 1966 and a Ph.D. in condensed matter theory, in 1968 from Leningrad University.

Shklovskii is known for the Efros–Shklovskii variable-range hopping conductivity, a model for the temperature dependence of the electrical conductivity in the variable-range hopping regime.
He has also made important contributions to the theory of the Quantum Hall effect (explaining the structure of conducting edge channels and predicting the formation of Quantum Hall stripe and bubble phases) and to the theory of macromolecules (developing the theory of electrostatic charge inversion).

Honors and awards
Shklovskii was awarded the Landau Prize of Academy of Sciences of USSR in 1986, the A.S. Fine Chair in Theoretical Physics in 1990, and was elected a fellow of the American Physical Society in 1997.

In 2018, he received the 2019 Oliver E. Buckley Condensed Matter Physics Prize for "pioneering research in the physics of disordered materials and hopping conductivity" together with Alexei L. Efros and Elihu Abrahams.

References

External links
National Public Radio Blog

1944 births
Living people
21st-century American physicists
Russian physicists
Saint Petersburg State University alumni
University of Minnesota faculty
Fellows of the American Physical Society
Oliver E. Buckley Condensed Matter Prize winners